Charles Stern (2 May 1914 – 11 October 1976) was a Swiss sailor. He competed at the 1948 Summer Olympics and the 1952 Summer Olympics.

References

External links
 

1914 births
1976 deaths
Swiss male sailors (sport)
Olympic sailors of Switzerland
Sailors at the 1948 Summer Olympics – 6 Metre
Sailors at the 1952 Summer Olympics – 6 Metre
Place of birth missing
20th-century Swiss people